Greenwich University is an informal name for the University of Greenwich.  It may refer to:

 University of Greenwich (United Kingdom), a historic university in London
Greenwich University (Pakistan), a recognized degree-awarding university in Karachi
Greenwich University (Norfolk Island), a controversial distance learning institution founded in Missouri which later moved to Hawaii, then to Norfolk Island